John (IV) de Mowbray, 1st Earl of Nottingham, 5th Baron Mowbray, 6th Baron Segrave (1 August 136512 January 1383), was an English peer.

Born 1 August 1365 at Epworth in the Isle of Axholme, Lincolnshire, John de Mowbray was the elder son of John de Mowbray, 4th Baron Mowbray, and Elizabeth Segrave. He had a younger brother, Thomas de Mowbray, 1st Duke of Norfolk, and three sisters, Eleanor, Margaret and Joan  (for details concerning his siblings, see the article on his father, John de Mowbray, 4th Baron Mowbray). He was styled 'cousin' by John of Gaunt, 1st Duke of Lancaster.

At the death of his mother in 1368, Mowbray is said to have become Baron Segrave. However he had little financial benefit from his inheritance as a result of the very large jointure which had been awarded to Elizabeth Segrave's mother, Margaret, Duchess of Norfolk, who lived until 1399.

In 1368 he also succeeded to the barony of Mowbray when his father was slain by the Turks near Constantinople while en route to the Holy Land.

In April 1372, custody of both John and his brother Thomas was granted to Blanche Wake, a sister of their grandmother, Joan of Lancaster. On 23 April 1377, he was knighted in company with the future Richard II and the future Henry IV when the latter two noblemen were made Knights of the Bath. When Richard II was crowned on 16 July 1377, Mowbray was created Earl of Nottingham. As joint tenants of the estates of William Beauchamp of Bedford, he and William Latimer, 4th Baron Latimer successfully claimed the right to serve as Almoner at the coronation.

Mowbray died before 12 February 1383, aged seventeen and unmarried, and was buried at the Whitefriars in Fleet Street, London. The earldom of Nottingham became extinct at his death. He was succeeded in the barony of Mowbray by his younger brother, Thomas de Mowbray, 1st Duke of Norfolk, who subsequently became Earl of Nottingham on 12 January 1386 by a new creation of the earldom.

Further reading
Burke, Sir Bernard, Mowbray-Earls of Nottingham, Dukes of Norfolk, Earls-Marshal, Earls of Warren and Surrey. A Genealogical History of the Dormant, Abeyant, Forfeited, and Extinct Peerages, of the British Empire. London: Wm. Clowes and Sons, Ltd., 1962. p. 387.
Chesne, R. W. L.  Le fief de Quesneto.  1975.

Notes

References

1365 births
1383 deaths
People from Epworth, Lincolnshire
14th-century English people
Barons Mowbray
06
11
John